Kung Fu Yoga is a 2017 Chinese action adventure comedy film written and directed by Stanley Tong and starring Jackie Chan. The film's cast includes Chinese actors Aarif Rahman, Lay Zhang, and Miya Muqi, and Indian actors Disha Patani, Sonu Sood, and Amyra Dastur.

The film was released in China on 28 January 2017. It features original music composed by Nathan Wang and an ending dance number choreographed by Farah Khan.

It is Jackie Chan's highest-grossing film in China. It was also the highest-grossing comedy film in China, until it was overtaken by Never Say Die (2017).

Plot
Jack (Jackie Chan), a renowned professor of archaeology at the Terracotta Warriors Museum in Xi'an, teams up with young Indian professor Ashmita (Disha Patani) from the National Museum Institute, Rajasthan to locate India's lost Magadha treasure in Tibet. Their team, Jones Lee (Aarif Rahman), Xiaoguang (Lay Zhang), Kyra (Amyra Dastur) and Noumin (Miya Muqi); find the treasure underneath a frozen lake using modern technology. However, they are interrupted by a group of mercenaries led by Randall (Sonu Sood) who steals the treasure and leaves them there to die. In the chaos, Jones – a member from Jack's team who is more a treasure hunter than an archaeologist smuggles away a diamond artifact. Jack's and Ashmita's team manages to escape from the underground icy cavern through an opening.

Two weeks later, the 212-carat diamond artifact pops up in Dubai for auction on the black market. To save his job, Jack attempts to get back the artifact with the help of a rich friend. Jack wins the auction but Randall strikes again with his goons which results in a high speed car chase through heavy traffic in Dubai. In the ensuing chase, Ashmita snatches it from them. Jack investigates Ashmita's whereabouts and finds she is not who she claimed to be before but the youngest descendant of Magadha royalty. Ashmita explains the diamond artifact is known as the "Eye of Shiva" in their family chronicles and it is the key to immense treasure hidden somewhere.

She asks Jack to help her find the real treasure and protect it from wrong hands. They further find the diamond artifact is a part of a scepter that opens a map room built using vastu shastra and astronomical positions of that period in a closed part of a sacred temple. Randall kidnaps Jack and Ashmita, demands to find the treasure for him because it belonged to his family. They all together find the map room which happens to be a puzzle room where a wrong move can cost lives.

They reach an underground Shiva temple made out of gold that is nearby a secluded waterfall. Reaching there, Randall's group begins to extract gems and diamonds from the temple decorations and searches for the treasure, but to his despair, they find that the legendary treasure is ancient knowledge about medicine, Buddhism, mechanical structures, and many more. In despair, Randall tries to destroy everything, but Jack, Ashmita and their team fight to stop them. Jack uses principles of yoga and kung fu to defeat Randall and convinces him of the significant importance of this finding. Meanwhile, a group of Sannyasis comes down through the new opening above ground and, upon seeing the magnificence of the deity in the underground temple, they start to sing and dance in joy. The groups that were fighting, realizing their pettiness, stop fighting and happily join with the joyous expression.

Cast

Jackie Chan as Jack
Aarif Rahman as Jones Lee
Lay Zhang as Xiaoguang
Disha Patani as Ashmita
Miya Muqi as Noumin
Sonu Sood as Randall
Amyra Dastur – Kyra
Muh Bahtiar C – Thyar
David Torok
Jain Kumar
Wen Jiang
Eric Tsang as Jianhua
Zhang Guoli as Jonathan
Shang Yuxian
Eskindir Tesfay
Moeed Rehman as Oxan
Godaan Kumar
Paul Philip Clark
Yuxian Shang
Jiang Wen
Gao Ming as Museum Curator
Lavlin Thadani as Professor Ashmita
Kevin Lee as a hitman

Production
Principal photography began in Beijing in September, before moving to Xi'an and Dubai on 27 September and ended on 30 October. Filming then continued in Beijing and India in December. Filming also took place in Iceland.

The film originally began as a Sino-Indian co-production. However, its Indian production partner Viacom 18 eventually pulled out of the production.  Viacom 18 stated: "We had every intent to collaborate with ‘Kung Fu Yoga.’ However things didn't work out as planned.  But we are optimistic about more such partnerships in the future."

The film was produced primarily by the Chinese studios Taihe Entertainment and Shinework Pictures.

According to director Stanley Tong, Bollywood star Aamir Khan was initially offered a major role in the film, but he could not take up the offer due to scheduling conflicts, as he was busy shooting for his own film, the blockbuster Dangal (2016). The ending dance number in Kung Fu Yoga was choreographed by Bollywood musical dance choreographer Farah Khan.

Music

Nathan Wang composed the background score. The soundtrack was released on 2017.

Release
Kung Fu Yoga was released in China on 28 January 2017. It was released in the Philippines by Star Cinema (replacing Viva International Pictures as distributor) on 1 February 2017. In India, the film was released by Tanweer Films on 3 February 2017.

Reception

Box office
The film was a major box-office success in China, where it became Jackie Chan's highest-grossing film in China and one of the top ten highest-grossing films of all time, grossing ¥1.753billion (US$254,531,595). In comparison, it was a commercial failure in India, where it grossed  on its opening day. The film opened at number 1 in Singapore, earning $1.85 million, during its weekend debut of 28 January 2017.

Critical response
On Rotten Tomatoes, the film received a score of 48%, based on 23 critics' reviews. On Metacritic, the film received a weighted average score of 50 out of 100, based on 9 critics, indicating "mixed or average reviews".

References

External links 
 

2010s adventure comedy films
2010s Hindi-language films
2017 action comedy films
2017 films
Chinese action adventure films
Chinese action comedy films
Films about Tibet
Films directed by Stanley Tong
Films scored by Nathan Wang
Films set in Dubai
Films set in Rajasthan
Films shot in Beijing
Films shot in Dubai
Films shot in Iceland
Films shot in Rajasthan
Films shot in Shaanxi
Films shot in India
Treasure hunt films
2010s English-language films
2010s Mandarin-language films
2017 multilingual films
Chinese multilingual films